Shimon Hadari is an Israeli football manager.  Recently Hadari managed Ironi Kiryat Shmona, Beitar Jerusalem and Hapoel Acre in the Israeli Premier League.

References
 Personal Page at IFA

1962 births
Living people
People from Kiryat Shmona
Israeli football managers
Hapoel Acre F.C. managers
Maccabi Ahi Nazareth F.C. managers
Maccabi Herzliya F.C. managers
Beitar Jerusalem F.C. managers
Hapoel Nof HaGalil F.C. managers
Hapoel Ironi Kiryat Shmona F.C. managers
Israeli Premier League managers
Israeli people of Moroccan-Jewish descent